The European Consortium of Liberal Arts and Sciences, or ECOLAS, is a non-governmental educational consulting group based in Europe, that proposes to address key issues associated with undergraduate education as a consequence of the reforms initiated by the Bologna Process.  It was founded by three international educators, Samuel Abraham, President and Rector of the Bratislava International School of Liberal Arts (Slovakia), Hans Adriaansens, Dean of Roosevelt Academy (Netherlands), and Laurent Boetsch, President Emeritus of European College of Liberal Arts, Berlin (Germany).

Mission

The mission of ECOLAS is to work within the sphere of European undergraduate education to foster and disseminate good practices essential to nurturing the ideals and skills necessary for lifelong learning and good citizenship that are embedded in the educational tradition of the liberal arts and sciences.

Organization

The consortium is a voluntary association headed by an Executive Board formed by the three founders and Jochen Fried of the Salzburg Global Seminar.  The Board is responsible for the overall supervision, implementation and evaluation of projects undertaken.  ECOLAS Associates are a team of international educational experts who work in association with the consortium and who are assigned to projects depending on their particular areas of expertise and experience.  Each is committed to the values of liberal education and to the overall mission of ECOLAS.  Partner Institutions will serve as successful and appropriate programme models, host consortium conferences and seminars, and help to provide future trainers and advisors for subsequent projects.

Current projects

ECOLAS has recently received a grant form the European Union as an Erasmus Multilateral Project within its Modernisation of Higher Education initiative in Lifelong Learning Programme.  Those funds are expected to meet three-quarters of the costs of operation for the first two-years of the consortium.  Projects planned within the course of the grant funding include: the preparation of a comprehensive information manual on the history, values, and methodology of the liberal arts and their potential for undergraduate education in Europe; a major conference for associates, institutional partners, and interested parties to focus on the practical aspects of establishing a liberal arts programme; a "flying advisors" initiative to provide expert advice to partner institutions and newly established liberal arts programmes; the creation of a database of information concerning current initiatives in the liberal arts; the establishment of a website detailing consortial activities and providing a central source of information about liberal arts education in Europe; an outline of a quality assurance framework with criteria and procedures for current and emerging programmes in the liberal arts.

References

External links
 Official website of ECOLAS

Associations of schools
Consortia in Europe
Higher education organisations based in Europe